Todd Hendricks (born August 13, 1968)  is a former professional American football player who played wide receiver, running back, and kick returner. Hendricks played professionally for several seasons in the Austrian Football League's highest level. He later played in Switzerland's Nationalliga A (American football).

Hendricks played college football at Minnesota State-Fergus Falls and the University of Mary. He was inducted into the Minnesota College Athletic Conference Hall of Fame and the National Minor League Football Hall of Fame. He has been a successful coach since his playing career ended.

Early years 

Todd Hendricks played for Alexandria Area High School in Alexandria, Minnesota as a standout football, basketball and track athlete. He went on to play four seasons of college football as receiver, running back and kick returner. Hendricks earned all Minnesota College Athletic Conference honors in football and track (Sprints) and was named 1988 JC Gridwire All-American for his all purpose production rushing, receiving and kick returns at Minnesota State Community & Technical College-Fergus Falls. Hendricks was inducted to the Minnesota College Athletic Conference Hall of Fame in 2015.

On an athletic scholarship, Hendricks played the final two years of his college football career at the University of Mary Marauders. In his senior season, Hendricks earned All Conference honors as a starting receiver and ranked in the top five in the league in receiving. Hendricks helped lead the University of Mary to its first ever top 25 final national ranking in 1991 as a team captain. Hendricks returned to college and earned his bachelor's degree from the University of Mary in 2000.

Professional career 

Hendricks went unsigned after NFL tryouts.  On December 28, 1992, Hendricks signed a Professional sports contract in the Austrian Football League for the AFC Rangers of Vienna, Austria. He played all or parts of six seasons - 1993, 1995-1997, 2000,2002 - for the AFC Rangers, reaching the Austrian Football League playoffs semi final four times, as well as the European Football League 1996 Eurobowl tournament playoffs.
In 1995, Hendricks was honored as Austrian Football League MVP and Offensive Player of the Year. Hendricks scored a league record 20 touchdowns (14 receiving and 6 rushing) that season in eight games. He was named All Europe by the European Federation of American Football after the 1995, 1996, and 1997 seasons. He averaged 167 all purpose yards and over two touchdowns per game in his career in Europe, and is considered one of the all time greats to play in Austrian Football League and Europe.

In 1999, Hendricks played for the St Paul Pigs in Minnesota. Hendricks led the team in rushing and led the league in yards per reception, while also finishing second in the league in receiving touchdowns. He helped the Pigs to an undefeated season and won the league championship. Hendricks was named to the Mid America League and AFA all star teams. The Pigs franchise folded after its only season.
  
The next season, 2000, Hendricks returned to Europe and again played for the Rangers in the Austrian Football League and was named to the league all star team.

In 2008, Hendricks played and coached the last three games of the season for the Vienna Knights in Austria.

In 2009, Hendricks signed with the Bern Grizzlies of Switzerland's top level Nationalliga A (American football). Hendricks ruptured his Achilles' tendon ending his season early in the fifth game. Hendricks had scored eight touchdowns before the injury.

In 2010, he came back from the injury signing to play and coach with the Thun Tigers of Switzerland. Hendricks accounted for 19 total touchdowns in his final season as a player.

Hendricks was inducted to the US National Minor league football (gridiron) Hall of Fame in 2004. He has helped promote the game in the USA and Europe at schools, camps, and clinics.

Coaching 

Hendricks has coached in the US and Europe. He has a record of 91-35-1 and four championships as a head coach at Wabasso High School 2002-2004, Alexandria Mustangs, Bern Grizzlies in Switzerland, and Terni Steelers, Viterbo Pitbulls in Italy. He has also served as an assistant coach or coordinator at Osakis High School, Kimball High School, ACGC High School, Ridgewater College, Augsburg University, Thun Tigers in Switzerland and AFC Rangers in Austria. 
In 2021, Hendricks was an assistant football coach at North Dakota State College of Science. He is currently an assistant coach at West Central Area High School.

References
 Hendricks signs with Thun Tigers.
 

 

  

1968 births
Living people
People from Graceville, Minnesota
Players of American football from Minnesota
People from Alexandria, Minnesota
University of Mary alumni
American football wide receivers
American expatriate sportspeople in Austria
American expatriate players of American football
American expatriate sportspeople in Switzerland
American expatriate sportspeople in Italy
American football running backs
Mary Marauders football players